"Lover Why" is the first single released by French rock band Century, in 1985. The song belongs to their debut album, ...And Soul It Goes.

It was the group's most successful song on the charts, ranking first in France and Portugal, as well as entering the charts in Germany (#32), Belgium (#33) and Switzerland (#11).
In Brazil the song became popular for being featured in the soundtrack for Rede Globo's soap opera Ti Ti Ti.

There are dance versions of "Lover Why" made by Dee Martin (1993) and Mark Ashley (2000). The song was re-recorded in 1987 by Portuguese musician José Maria.

Plot 

The song evokes the break and the difficulties of living without being loved.

Track listing

Portugal 7 "Single

Charts

Certifications and sales

References

External links
 https://www.discogs.com/Century-Lover-Why/master/160607

1985 debut singles
1985 songs
Century (band) songs
Number-one singles in France
Carrere Records singles
SNEP Top Singles number-one singles